Octagon is an album by American jazz group the String Trio of New York recorded in 1992 for the Italian Black Saint label.

Reception
The Allmusic review awarded the album 4½ stars.

Track listing
 "The Pursuit of Happiness" (James Emery) - 7:05 
 "One for Robin" (Marty Ehrlich) - 5:28 
 "Strings and Things" (Muhal Richard Abrams) - 7:19 
 "Circular Views" (John Lindberg) - 7:42 
 "Upside the Downside" (Mark Helias) - 13:09 
 "Forever February" (Regina Carter) - 7:11 
 "Billie: The Queen of Holiday" (Wadada Leo Smith) - 13:06 
 "A Short History of the Balkans" (Bobby Previte) - 8:12 
Recorded at Barigozzi Studio in Milano, Italy on November 5 & 6, 1992

Personnel
Regina Carter - violin
James Emery - guitar
John Lindberg - bass

References

Black Saint/Soul Note albums
String Trio of New York albums
1992 albums